Thomas Waite (11 November 1718 – 2 February 1780), was an Irish civil servant.

Waite was Under-Secretary for Ireland to the Chief Secretary for Ireland between 1747 and 1777. He was also Secretary to the Lords Justices of Ireland during the long absences from Ireland of the Lord Lieutenant and Chief Secretary for Ireland in the period up to 1767.

References 
PRONI - Wilmot Papers (T3019)

Under-Secretaries for Ireland
Members of the Privy Council of Ireland
1718 births
1780 deaths